Ligeia Siren is a chalk drawing by Dante Gabriel Rossetti (DGR) that was completed in 1873. The painting depicts a siren, a creature from classic Greek mythology, that also appear in tales such as Homer's Odyssey or Virgil's Georgics. The drawing is predominantly inspired from Rossetti's own 1869 libretto The Doom of the Sirens with which Ligeia is one of the female leads. Instead of depicting the traditional encounter of the siren with her victims entranced by her beauty and powers of music, doomed to a terrible fate, as in The Siren (1900) by John William Waterhouse or Ulysses and the Sirens (1909) by Herbert James Draper. Rossetti depicts a timeless moment, where contrary to his depiction of her in his libretto, she appears tranquil and relatively innocuous to her intended victims in the background.

In his extremely detailed documentation of his brother's life and works, William Michael Rossetti documented DGR writing of Ligeia Siren as "certainly one of my best things" and though it was only a drawing done in chalk that it was "quite an elaborate picture." The body is that of an unknown woman, however face of the drawing is that of model Alexa Wilding, with whom Rossetti drew and painted often and can be seen as the subject of many of his works at this time such as La Ghirlandata and Veronica Veronese. She is standing amongst vegetation. with an exotic instrument, staring out into the distance. The bird on the instrument acts to identify the female figure as a siren from antiquity, as they were originally depicted with wings or "birds inhabited by soulds of the dead.

The Doom of Sirens
Outside of his inner circle of friends, family, and wealthy patrons, Rossetti was often more well known for his poetry and pieces of literature than his paintings or drawings.  Yet this libretto is still largely unknown. It is an ornate delivery of one of Rossetti's obsessions: the femme fatale and his "lifelong exploration of the complex social and cultural significance of the (female) figure" and it was only published after his death by his brother William.  Rossetti has written and drawn or painted several other works with subject matter concerning the myth of the Siren. A poem "Death's Songsters" (1870) and a prose piece "The Orchard Pit" (1869) as well as his drawing Boatmen and Siren (1853) and his oil painting A Sea-Spell (1877).

In his libretto, Ligeia is one of the three sisters of sirens, the other two being Thelxiope, Thelxione, living on a remote island titled "Siren's Rock" . With her song of love, Ligeia claims the life of a king and queen, whose son is miraculously rescued by the hermit. The very same hermit who previously issued the couple a warning to stay clear of the island. Before she dies the queen curses Ligeia to the same fate of her victims, that she may love and die for it. Years and years later, that same rescued prince returns to the island to enact the doom of the sirens. Ligeia eventually meets her fate.

With in The Doom of Sirens, and within Ligeia Siren as well, there are core themes for Rossetti. One of the themes is the juxtaposition of the pagan/Christian dichotomy, the clash of a pagan mythical being and a Christian prince, and the triumph of the prince in the end . Also present, and more important for Rossetti, is the survival of love even when death is eminent or even after death has occurred.

Music and Art

Rossetti often uses musical instruments next to a beautiful women in his paintings. Ligeia Siren uses an Indian sarinda with which Ligeia is holding delicately. In the 1870s artists were fascinated by the relationships between sounds, colors, and the senses. Walter Pater published in 1877 The School of Giorgione where he famously stated that "All art constantly aspires towards the condition of music."

Dante Gabriel Rossetti also believed that music had power to entrance and transport the viewer elsewhere. It had the power to set a mood and this is something he looked to accomplish in his own works. He also used this musicality to express a wider viewpoint and fascination with the physiognomy of his work, a way in which the beauty of the women he depicts reveal inner qualities or truths about them and this is extended to the instruments that he places within the compositions. His use and placement of the instrument in his works were usually calculated and purposeful, even their misuse or improper positioning by the predominant figure, in order to achieve his incredibly symbolic and expressive aims he would enhance or sharpen physical features of both figure and instrument. With Ligeia Siren, the power of the mythical being lies within her music. Rossetti recognized celestial associations with music and its means to lift everyday people from their boring lives into a spiritual one.

Pre-Raphaelite Brotherhood and Influence
The Pre-Raphaelite Brotherhood were a group of artists with core values wishing the return to artistic styles and norms to those of artists existing before Raphael, who they believed had led the art world astray. They believed that "artifice was to be abandoned in favour of an earnest truthfulness, a blurring of the boundaries between art and life, a kind of super realism which might embody a higher truth." The brotherhood often criticized modern art as  overly dramatic and "sloshy", which they defined as anything "lax or scamped in the process", they contributed these terms to a largely popular artist at the time Sir Joshua Reynolds whom they loving called 'Sir Sloshua'. Many of the values of the brotherhood stayed with Rossetti for the rest of his creative career, even as he would separate from them.

Many of Rossetti's later works, like Ligeia Siren, are often contributed to the Pre-Raphaelite Brotherhood though he was no longer with the group by this time. His later works were often were criticized by fellow Pre-Raphaelite brothers as representative of Rossetti's own desires for the opposite sex, existing only as beauty without a purpose, pictures lacking any moral or valuable narrative. Rossetti continued to develop his own deeply personal style that would be considered it a degradation of art. Member of the Pre-Raphaelite Brotherhood would try to distinguish themselves from this work by designating the period after with which Rossetti participated in the fraternity as the (late) Pre-Raphaelite Brotherhood. Meanwhile, Rossetti formed a new group of his own that they lightly called the 'second generation' of Pre-Raphaelitism.

History
Rossetti stopped publicly exhibiting his work after a harsh criticism he received on a painting titled Ecce Ancilla Domini (1849–50). He predominantly sold his work directly to patrons and friends instead. It was impossible to see multiples of his work at any given moment, this made it difficult for the art world and its critics to for any kind of impression of his artistry. This is true in the case of Ligeia Siren.  According to William Michael Rossetti's detailed records of his brothers life the chalk drawing was intended to go to William Graham along with La Ghirlandata for the price of £1000. However it was passed over because of Ligeia's nudity. It eventually sold to a Charles Howell in August 1873. After bouncing around from a few people as debt payments, Ligeia Siren wasn't publicly known or seen after 1880 and did not resurface until a century later in 1973 where it was sold to a private collector by Christies.

Notes

References
Davison, Alan. "Woven Songs and Musical Mirrors: Dante Gabriel Rossetti's 'Symbolic Physiognomy' of Music." The British Art Journal 13, no. 3 (Winter 2012/13): 89-94.
Everette, Glen. "Dante Gabriel Rossetti: Biography." The Victorian Web: Literature, History, and Culture in the Age of Victoria. Last modified 1988. http://www.victorianweb.org/authors/dgr/dgrseti13.html 
Macleod, Dianne S. "Rossetti's Two Ligeias: Their Relationship to Visual Art, Music, and Poetry." Victorian Poetry 20, no. 3/4 (Autumn- Winter 1982): 89-102.
 "The Doom of the Sirens." Rossetti Archive. Institute for Advanced Technology in the Humanities, University of Virginia.   http://www.rossettiarchive.org/docs/47p-1869.dukems.rad.html.Accessed December 7, 2018.
Rossetti Archive. Institute for Advanced Technology in the Humanities, University of Virginia. http://www.rossettiarchive.org/. Accessed December 7, 2018. 
Rossetti, William M. Dante Gabriel Rossetti as Designer and Writer. Reprinted New York: AMS Press Inc, 1970.
Tickner, Lisa. Dante Gabriel Rossetti. London: Tate Publishing, 2003.
Upstone, Robert. The Pre-Raphaelite Dream: Paintings and Drawings from the Tate Collection. London: Tate Publishing, 2003.

External links
Dante Gabriel Rossetti - A Hypermedia Archive
Ligeia Siren work analysis

Paintings by Dante Gabriel Rossetti
1873 paintings
Musical instruments in art
Maritime paintings